Vanderlei Fernandes Silva (born 14 July 1975), known as Derlei, is a Brazilian former footballer who played as a striker.

He spent most of his 16-year professional career in Portugal (one full decade), having represented all three most important clubs in the country and amassing Primeira Liga totals of 187 matches and 70 goals. He also played two seasons with Dynamo Moscow in the Russian Premier League.

With Porto, Derlei won eight major titles including two leagues, one Champions League and one UEFA Cup.

Club career

Early career
Born in São Bernardo do Campo, São Paulo, Derlei began playing in the lower levels of Brazilian football, but joined Portugal's U.D. Leiria in 1999, going on to appear in 92 competitive games for the club. In his last season, as they overachieved for a final seventh place in the Primeira Liga led by young manager José Mourinho, he scored 21 goals.

Porto and Dynamo
Derlei signed with FC Porto in the summer of 2002, playing an important part in a successful squad that was also managed by Mourinho, and being nicknamed "Ninja" while playing for the northern side. In his second game on 2 September, a 1–0 local derby victory at Boavista FC, he was sent off for fighting with his compatriot and former Leiria teammate, Éder Gaúcho; he was suspended for two games and his opponent for one. He was the top scorer of the 2002–03 UEFA Cup with 12 goals in 13 games; this tally included two in the 3–2 final win  against Celtic to overtake opponent Henrik Larsson, as well as braces in the preceding rounds against Panathinaikos F.C. and S.S. Lazio.

In the 2003–04 Primeira Liga, Derlei was leading the domestic goalscoring chart, including a hat-trick on 5 October in a 4–1 home win over Académica de Coimbra, but suffered a right knee anterior cruciate ligament injury against F.C. Alverca on 22 December, initially being ruled out for the rest of the season by the club's doctor. He recovered to face the same team on 25 April, and on 5 May he scored a penalty for the only goal of the UEFA Champions League semi-final away to Deportivo de La Coruña, as his team eventually lifted the title.

In January 2005, after disciplinary problems related to his lateness in arriving from the winter break, Derlei was sold to FC Dynamo Moscow for €7 million.  After two years in Russian football where he was always one of the top five scorers, he moved to S.L. Benfica on loan in January 2007. He played his first league match for the latter on 2 February, coming on as a second-half substitute in a 0–0 home draw with Boavista; his only goal in 16 appearances opened a 2–0 win over Académica on the final day of the season at the Estádio da Luz.

Sporting
Derlei left for Lisbon rivals Sporting CP in late June 2007, signing a one-year deal with the option for another after being freed from his two-year contract with Dynamo Moscow – he was, therefore, one of the few players to have represented the Big Three of Portugal. He spent most of 2007–08 on the sidelines, with another serious knee injury.

Derlei made a comeback to competition when, on 16 April 2008, he entered the field for Leandro Romagnoli in the 61st minute during the semi-final of the Taça de Portugal against Benfica, scoring only 18 minutes later to make it 3–2 to Sporting, in a match which eventually ended with a 5–3 win as the team went on to win the tournament against another former acquaintance of the player, Porto.

In his second season, Derlei fought with Hélder Postiga for a chance to play alongside Liédson, and scored some goals including an important one in a 1–0 home victory over FC Shakhtar Donetsk in the Champions League, which sealed Sporting's group stage qualification on 4 November 2008. At the end of the campaign, he declined the club's offer for a contract extension on the grounds the compensation was insufficient, thus being made a free agent.

Return to Brazil
On 27 August 2009, 34-year-old Derlei joined Vitória on a one-year deal. He made his competitive debut on 13 September in a match against Campeonato Brasileiro Série A leaders Palmeiras; having taken the pitch in the second half, he scored the 3–2 winner;

Derlei transferred to modest Madureira shortly after, returning to a team he had represented more than one decade prior.

International career
After winning the UEFA Cup with Porto in 2003, Derlei was called up to represent Brazil at the year's FIFA Confederations Cup, which several of the team's regulars had declined. He turned down the offer as it required for him to sign up to a company.

Derlei then began the process of acquiring Portuguese nationality in the aim of representing their national side on home soil at UEFA Euro 2004, but injury allowed his former clubmate Postiga to cement a place instead. His citizenship was confirmed that August, after the tournament, but he was never called up.

Club statistics

Honours
América-RN
Campeonato Potiguar: 1996

Porto
Primeira Liga: 2002–03, 2003–04
Taça de Portugal: 2002–03
Supertaça Cândido de Oliveira: 2003, 2004
UEFA Champions League: 2003–04
UEFA Cup: 2002–03
Intercontinental Cup: 2004

Sporting
Taça de Portugal: 2007–08
Supertaça Cândido de Oliveira: 2007, 2008
Taça da Liga runner-up: 2007–08, 2008–09
Individual
UEFA Cup Top Scorer: 2002–03
SJPF Player of the Month: October 2004

References

External links

PortuGOAL profile

1975 births
Living people
People from São Bernardo do Campo
Footballers from São Paulo (state)
Naturalised citizens of Portugal
Brazilian people of Portuguese descent
Brazilian footballers
Association football forwards
Campeonato Brasileiro Série A players
Campeonato Brasileiro Série C players
América Futebol Clube (RN) players
Guarani FC players
Madureira Esporte Clube players
Esporte Clube Vitória players
Primeira Liga players
U.D. Leiria players
FC Porto players
UEFA Cup winning players
S.L. Benfica footballers
Sporting CP footballers
Russian Premier League players
FC Dynamo Moscow players
UEFA Champions League winning players
Brazilian expatriate footballers
Expatriate footballers in Portugal
Expatriate footballers in Russia
Brazilian expatriate sportspeople in Portugal
Brazilian expatriate sportspeople in Russia